= Wielka Niedźwiedzianka =

Location
- Country: Poland

Wielka Niedźwiedzianka is a river of Poland, a tributary of the Niedźwiedzianka.
